The 1989 Brazilian motorcycle Grand Prix was the last round of the 1989 Grand Prix motorcycle racing season. It took place on the weekend of 15–17 September 1989 at the Goiânia circuit.

500 cc race report
Wayne Rainey has to win and Eddie Lawson has to finish outside the top 11 in order for Lawson to lose the championship. Reflecting on the mistake in Sweden that turned the championship around, Rainey says: “It’s really hard to tell you what I feel like. I just feel like I’ve been beat up by everybody in the world, and I just feel so down and disappointed in myself. I just felt I really let myself down and my team. You know, it makes you feel like crap.”

Though he can phone in the race and still win the championship, Lawson gets the start and the first apex, followed by Kevin Schwantz and Rainey. Rainey passes Schwantz, who nearly highsides in third spot. The track surface is slippery, and Mick Doohan shows it by doing a big rear-end slide.

Schwantz passes Rainey, but it almost doesn't stick, as Rainey tries to deny him the pass and they almost touch. Lawson is getting a small gap in the lead.

Going through dense backmarker traffic, Schwantz catches Lawson. Both bikes are squirming and bucking under acceleration. In Lawson's draft on the straight, Schwantz pops out and passes on the brakes. Schwantz shows he can slide with the best of them as he gets the back-end spinning on the exits.

Schwantz manages to put a #32 between him and Lawson. Vince Cascino, perhaps trying to match Schwantz’ pace, crashes right in front of Lawson, who manages to avoid the bike and rider but the distraction costs him some tenths.

Last lap, Schwantz wins with a gap between him and Lawson, and Rainey takes third.

500 cc classification

References

Brazilian motorcycle Grand Prix
Brazilian
Motorcycle Grand Prix